A multireedist is a musician capable of performing on more than one reed instrument.  Many reed instruments are similar enough that if a musician plays one, they are expected to be able to play the other.  Examples of this are the oboe and English horn or the clarinet and saxophone.  Multireedists are valued more highly than their single instrument counterparts. In many Broadway musicals, reed or wind parts require the performing musician to play multiple instruments during the course of the work.

Woodwind musicians